The Female of the Species is a 1912 short film directed by D. W. Griffith.

Cast
Charles H. West - The Miner
Claire McDowell - The Miner's Wife
Mary Pickford - The Miner's Wife's Sister
Dorothy Bernard - The Other Woman

References

External links
The Female of the Species at IMDb.com

 The Female of the Species available for free download at Internet Archive

1912 films
American silent short films
Films directed by D. W. Griffith
1912 short films
1912 drama films
Silent American drama films
American black-and-white films
1910s American films